Carole Rouillard (born March 15, 1960 in Montreal, Quebec) is a retired long-distance runner from Canada, who represented her country twice in the women's 10,000 metres at the Summer Olympics, starting in 1988 (Seoul, South Korea). She won the gold medal in the women's marathon at the 1994 Commonwealth Games.

Achievements

References

External links
 
 
 
 
 
 

1960 births
Living people
Canadian female long-distance runners
Athletes (track and field) at the 1988 Summer Olympics
Athletes (track and field) at the 1992 Summer Olympics
Athletes (track and field) at the 1986 Commonwealth Games
Athletes (track and field) at the 1990 Commonwealth Games
Athletes (track and field) at the 1994 Commonwealth Games
Commonwealth Games medallists in athletics
Commonwealth Games gold medallists for Canada
Olympic track and field athletes of Canada
World Athletics Championships athletes for Canada
Athletes from Montreal
French Quebecers
Medallists at the 1994 Commonwealth Games